Nicola Bellomo (2 February 1881 in Bari, Apulia, Italy – 11 September 1945 in Island of Nisida, Naples, Italy) was a general in the Italian Army during World War II. He was tried for war crimes at a court-martial for the murder of a British prisoner of war. He was found guilty. He was one of the few Italian commissioned officers prosecuted for war crimes during World War II, and the only one to be executed by a British-controlled court.

Career

Military service
Bellomo was a career officer in the Italian Army from the regular class of the Italian Military Academy of Modena.  At the outbreak of World War I, he held the rank of Artillery Captain and during that war he was awarded his first Italian Silver Medal of Military Valor for gallantry in action. He gave up active duty in 1936, but was reactivated in 1941, when he was assigned as commander of the XII MVSN Zone, and Bari province.

Shooting of prisoners
On 30 November 1941 two British prisoners of war, Captain George Playne of the Royal Armoured Corps and Lieutenant Roy Cooke escaped from Torre Tresca POW detention camp but were recaptured a few hours later. According to the results of the Italian Army investigation board, Bellomo was already waiting for them when they arrived back at the camp. He wanted to personally investigate the course of events leading to their escape, and asked the two British officers to show him the location from which they had launched their plan. Again, the two British prisoners took their chances to escape, although this time Italian sentries opened fire, killing Captain Playne and wounding Lieutenant Cooke. The investigation into the incident revealed no misconduct on Bellomo's part.

1943 armistice
On 9 September 1943, a day after the Armistice between Italy and Allied armed forces, Bellomo formed a makeshift Italian force to counterattack German forces that tried to occupy the port of Bari. Bellomo was wounded, but the action was successful; the Italians forced the Germans to retreat, leaving the port facilities intact. This allowed the safe and undisturbed landing of British troops on 22 September 1943 under Italian Army protection. A British force quickly moved north to Foggia, which they took on 27 September. By the end of the month, the entire Apulia region and most of southern Italy had been secured by Allied forces. Winston Churchill said, "September was a handful month for allied armies." In the meantime, Bellomo kept his position as commander of the XII MVSN Zone in Bari.

Shortly afterward, he was detained and arrested by the British military authority and charged with murder and attempted murder for his actions in the shooting of the two British POWs.

War crimes trial
On 28 January 1944 Bellomo was placed under arrest by the British Military Police and charged with "shooting or ordering to shoot two British officers, causing the death of one of them and the wounding of the other one." Lieutenant Cooke, the surviving prisoner, filed a report against Bellomo on 5 June 1945. In the following weeks, Bellomo was moved around several Allied POW camps, namely in Grumo Appula, Padula and Afragola. On 14 July 1945 Bellomo received formal communication of his trial. The court martial took place on 28 July 1945 and within an hour he was sentenced to death. Bellomo, who refused to ask for pardon, was executed by a firing squad on the Island of Nisida north of Naples on 11 September 1945. At that time, the island was occupied by the British Army and used as a prison facility.

His execution has been the cause of some controversy in Italy; some have claimed that Bellomo's court martial operated on insufficient evidence and contradictory statements, and therefore the sentence and the execution were unfair. Others believe that the British Court was influenced by "many Bellomo's Italian foes, e.g.: the Italian Army that almost everywhere collapsed, instead Bellomo successfully defended the Bari Harbour attacked by the German Forces, the Italian AntiFascist front marginalized by a general too close with the Crown and of course the  nostalgics of fascism. At least these forces totally isolated the general during the trial."

Posthumous award
In 1951, the new Italian Government posthumously awarded Bellomo his second Italian Silver Medal of Military Valor for his role in the defense of the seaport of Bari.

Honors and awards

References

 "Italy Betrayed", New York 1966, Peter Tompkins.
 “Closing the ring” The second World War, vol.5. Winston Churchill

1881 births
1945 deaths
People from Bari
Italian military personnel of World War II
20th-century executions by the United Kingdom
Italian generals
Executed Italian people
Italian military personnel of World War I
Italian people convicted of war crimes
People executed by the British military by firing squad
People executed for war crimes
People who were court-martialed